Nanda Nanditha (alternatively Nanda Loves Nanditha) is a 2008 Indian Kannada language film directed by B. N. Vijayakumar starring Yogesh and Swetha. The film was remade into a Tamil and Telugu as a bilingual movie titled as Nanda Nanditha (2012). After the film's success, Swetha appended Nanditha to her stage name.

Cast
 Yogesh as Nanda
 Swetha as Nanditha
 Avinash
 Suresh Chandra
 Suneetha Shetty
 Shobha
 Jayabalu
 Girija Lokesh

Soundtrack 
The songs were composed by Emil.

Reception 
R. G. Vijayasarathy of Rediff.com gave the film a rating of two out of five stars and wrote that "Other than Mathew Rajan's photography, there is nothing much to write about".

References

External links 
 

2000s Kannada-language films
2008 films
2000s romantic action films
Indian romantic action films
Kannada films remade in other languages